Agonopterix fuscovenella is a moth in the family Depressariidae. It was described by Rebel in 1917. It is found in Tunisia.

References

Moths described in 1917
Agonopterix
Moths of Africa